The 1864 Connecticut gubernatorial election was held on April 4, 1864, and the first of two gubernatorial elections in which the Republicans adopted the National Union Party name, as the national party had done during the 1864 presidential election.  Incumbent governor and National Union nominee William Alfred Buckingham defeated Democratic nominee Origen S. Seymour with 53.65% of the vote.

General election

Candidates
Major party candidates

William Alfred Buckingham, Republican/National Union
Origen S. Seymour, Democratic

Results

References

1864
Connecticut
Gubernatorial